Necla is a Turkish given name for females. People named Necla include:

 Necla Akdoğan (born 1971), Turkish women's footballer, referee and manager
 Necla Kelek (born 1957), Turkish-German feminist
 Necla Pur (born 1943), Turkish economist
 Nejla Ates (1932-2005), Turkish belly dancer (with anglicized spelling of Nejla from Turkish Necla)

See also
 Nejla, Arabic name

Turkish feminine given names